Æsa Sigurjónsdóttir (born 23 September 1959 in Reykjavík) is an Icelander art curator. She specializes in contemporary art, photography, history of photography and fashion. She is associate professor of art history and art theory at the University of Iceland.

Career and works
Æsa Sigurjónsdóttir began her career as an independent researcher and free-lance curator. She became an assistant professor in Art history at the University of Iceland in 2008.

She has written extensively on modern and contemporary art, photography, history of photography, and fashion, and has been the curator for several exhibitions related to Icelandic art in various European countries.

She has been chairman of board of the University of Iceland Art Museum since 2015.

She received the Fjöruverðlaunin price in 2009 in the category "Best non-fiction".

Books and major articles
 Transmettre l’art – Figures et méthodes – Quelle histoire ? Paris: Les presses du reel, 2013
 "The New Nordic Cool: Björk, Icelandic Fashion, and Art Today" in Fashion Theory, 2011
 "Nation, nature, reality". The history of art in Iceland from late 19th century to the beginning of the 21st century, Vol 2, National Museum of Iceland, 2011
 Icelandic Art Today, Ostfildern: Hatje Cantz, 2009

Curator and co-curator
 Feckless and Hotheaded, Galerie Raum mit Licht, Vienna, 2016 - 
 Marginalia – texts, sketches, and doodles in Kjarval's art, Reykjavik Art Museum, 2015
 Re-construction of Friendship, Corner House, Riga European Capital of Culture, 2014
 Tracks in Sand, retrospective of sculptor Sigurjón Ólafsson, National Gallery Iceland, 2014
 FNAGP (Fondation Nationale des Arts Graphiques et Plastiques), Paris, 2014
 Reality Check, Reykjavík Art Festival 2010
 Dreams of the Sublime in Contemporary Icelandic Art in Bozar, Brussels and Reykjavik Art Museum 2008
She has worked with a number of artists including Anne Herzog, Bryndís Snæbjörnsdóttir & Mark Wilson, Halldór Ásgeirsson, Icelandic Love Corporation, Kristleifur Björnsson, Olga Bergmann, Ólöf Nordal, Pétur Thomsen, Sigurður Guðmundson, Sigurður Guðjónsson, Hlynur Hállsson Spessi, et al.

See also
 Culture of Iceland
 List of Icelandic artists
 Center for Icelandic Art
 National Gallery of Iceland
 National Museum of Iceland
 SEQUENCES real-time art festival

References

European art curators
Aesa Sigurjonsdottir
Living people
1959 births
Aesa Sigurjonsdottir
Aesa Sigurjonsdottir
Women curators